Ninaithale Inikkum is an Indian Tamil-language television talk show, which aired for 22 episodes on Vendhar TV from 30 August 2014 to 5 April 2015 on every Sunday at 12:00PM IST. The talk show was presented by Tamil cinema actress Khushboo Sundar. The show features many segments including a whacky self indulging make-up by the celebrities, surprise guests either from the celebrity's family or personal friends, Shopping, and many more.

Guests included
Episode 1 & 2: Khushboo Sundar
Episode 3: Sivakarthikeyan
Episode 4: Vivek
Episode 5: Jiiva & Thulasi Nair
Episode 6: Vijay Sethupathi & Ramesh Thilak
Episode 7 & 8: K. Bhagyaraj
Episode 9: Priya Anand
Episode 10 & 11: R. Sarathkumar  
Episode 12: Sundar C.
Episode 13: Kovai Sarala
Episode 14: S. J. Surya
Episode 15: Siddharth 
Episode 16: Atharvaa 
Episode 17: Gautham Vasudev Menon
Episode 18: Poornima Bhagyaraj  
Episode 19: Nadhiya
Episode 20: Venkat Prabhu
Episode 21: Jayam Ravi
Episode 22: Raadhika Sarathkumar

International broadcast
The Series was released on 30 August 2014 on Vendhar TV. The Show was also broadcast internationally on Channel's international distribution. It airs in Australia, United States, Europe and Canada on Athavan TV. The show's episodes were released on Vendhar TV YouTube channel.

References

External links
 Vendhar TV Website 
 Vendhar TV on YouTube

2014 Tamil-language television series debuts
2015 Tamil-language television series endings
Tamil-language talk shows
Tamil-language television shows
Vendhar TV television series